The Albatross class was a class of minesweepers acquired by the United States Navy during World War II.

References 

 Minesweeper (AM)